Pak Shing Kok Station (Trad. Chinese: 百勝角站) was a proposed MTR station on the Tseung Kwan O Line between Tseung Kwan O station and LOHAS Park station in Pak Shing Kok, Tseung Kwan O, Sai Kung District, New Territories, Hong Kong. It was to serve low to medium-density residential buildings in Pak Shing Kok. However, construction was never begun due to inadequate population at the location.

The Hong Kong Fire and Ambulance Services Academy includes a mockup of an MTR station called Pak Shing Kok, used to train fire fighters in tackling incidents on the MTR system.

References

Tseung Kwan O
Proposed railway stations in Hong Kong